Kong Zhou (died  190), courtesy name Gongxu, was an official and minor warlord who lived during the Eastern Han dynasty of China.

Life
Little is recorded about Kong Zhou in history. He was from Chenliu Commandery, which is around present-day Kaifeng, Henan. The official Zheng Tai once mentioned that Kong Zhou excelled in qingtan (the philosophical repartee popular among the literati at the time) but lacked military leadership. In the 160s, Fu Rong recommended Kong Zhou as a talent to Feng Dai, the Administrator of Chenliu Commandery, who then appointed Kong Zhou as a Reporting Officer.

Around 189, Dong Zhuo, the warlord who controlled the Han central government, appointed Kong Zhou as the Inspector of Yu Province. In 190, Kong Zhou turned against Dong Zhuo and joined a coalition of warlords from the east of Hangu Pass in a military campaign to eliminate Dong Zhuo and free the central government from his control. However, he died not long later within the same year. After his death, another warlord Yuan Shu nominated Sun Jian to be the new Inspector of Yu Province.

See also
 Lists of people of the Three Kingdoms

References

 Chen, Shou (3rd century). Records of the Three Kingdoms (Sanguozhi).
 
 
 Fan, Ye (5th century). Book of the Later Han (Houhanshu).
 Pei, Songzhi (5th century). Annotations to Records of the Three Kingdoms (Sanguozhi zhu).

Han dynasty politicians from Henan
Han dynasty warlords
Politicians from Kaifeng
Political office-holders in Henan